Teachers' trades union in the United Kingdom are trades union for teachers in operating in the United Kingdom.

Due to the differing education systems in the UK, most unions only organise in certain parts of the country and some focus on certain members of staff, such as headteachers. Teaching is an unusual profession in that it does not have one leading union, but has many different ones, often with differing aims. Having said that, the NEU and NASUWT jointly represent the vast majority of teachers in England and Wales, while the EIS represents the majority of teachers in Scotland.

For teachers and school staff looking for an alternative to the traditional teaching unions, Edapt provides legal support and advice in England and Wales.

List of teachers' trade unions

The table below lists all the UK's registered teachers' unions in the primary and secondary education sectors (up to age 16), with details of establishment, membership, where they organise and the types of members they accept:

See also
UK labour law
List of trade unions in the United Kingdom

References

Education trade unions
Teacher associations based in the United Kingdom